Portent may refer to:

 Portent (divination), a phenomenon that is believed to foretell the future, also known as an omen or presage
 The Portent, a comic book
 USS Portent (AM-106), an Auk-class minesweeper